Prajapati was a Bengali social drama film directed by Biplab Chatterjee and produced by Rajesh Kumar based on the novel of Samaresh Basu in the same name. The film was released in 1993. A criminal case for obscenity was filed against the author Samaresh Basu and the publisher in 1968 for the original novel.

Plot
Sukhen, a youngman lives a casual life. He is innocent but neglected of his family. Sukhen loves Shikha and wants to live a normal and healthy life but his brothers are corrupt as well as politically powerful, who tries to use unemployed Sukhen for their political mileage.

Cast
 Biplab Chatterjee as Sukhendu Chatterjee
 Soumitra Chatterjee as Sukhendu's father
Dipankar Dey as Sukhendu's elder brother
Rabi Ghosh as Doctor
 Satabdi Roy as Sikha
 Mamata Shankar
Dilip Roy
 Soma Mukherjee 
Sandip Ghosh

References

External links
 

1993 films
1993 drama films
Bengali-language Indian films
Indian drama films
Films based on Indian novels
1990s Bengali-language films
Films based on works by Samaresh Basu